William Jephson  (died 11 April 1720) was Dean of Lismore  from 1691 until 1720.

He was educated at Trinity College Dublin. He was a Minor Canon at St Patrick's Cathedral, Dublin then Rector of Monaghan and Prebendary of Donoughmore. His final appointment was at Inishlonaght.

He died on 11 April 1720.

References

Alumni of Trinity College Dublin
Deans of Lismore
1720 deaths
Year of birth unknown